Guanghua Temple may refer to:

Guanghua Temple (Putian), built during the Southern Chen Dynasty (557–589 CE) century in Putian, Fujian, China
Guanghua Temple (Beijing), built during the Yuan Dynasty (1279–1368 CE) in Beijing, China

Buddhist temple disambiguation pages